The Eastern Naval Command is one of the three command-level formations of the Indian Navy. It is headquartered in Visakhapatnam, Andhra Pradesh. The command is responsible for the all naval forces in the Bay of Bengal and parts of the Indian Ocean and the naval establishments on the east coast of India.

The Command was established on 1 March 1968. The Command is commanded by a Three Star Flag Officer of the rank of Vice Admiral with the title Flag Officer Commanding-in-Chief Eastern Command (FOC-in-C). Vice Admiral Biswajit Dasgupta is the current FOC-in-C ENC, who took over on 30 November 2021.

History
After the independence and the partition of India on 15 August 1947, the ships and personnel of the Royal Indian Navy were divided between the Dominion of India and the Dominion of Pakistan. The division of the ships was on the basis of two-thirds of the fleet to India, one third to Pakistan.

The Surface Fleet of the Navy was called Indian Fleet and was commanded by the Flag Officer Commanding Indian Fleet (FOCIF). Initially, the shore establishments on the eastern coast were headed by a captain in the appointment of Naval Officer-in-Charge, Vishakapatnam (NOIC). This was subsequently upgraded to the appointment of Commodore East (COMEAST), a One Star appointment. The FOCIF and COMEAST reported into the Chief of the Naval Staff. In July 1967, COMEAST was upgraded to the two-star appointment of Flag Officer, East Coast (FOEC).  On 1 March 1968, the Eastern Fleet was also created. With this, the appointment of FOEC was re-designated Flag Officer Commanding-in-Chief Eastern Naval Command (FOC-in-C ENC). The Indian Fleet was split between the Western Fleet and the Eastern Fleet with the Fleet Officer Commanding Eastern Fleet (FOCEF) reporting into the FOC-in-C ENC. On 1 March 1971, Vice Admiral Nilakanta Krishnan took over as FOC-in-C, the first three-star officer to lead the command.

Area of responsibility
Under the Flag Officer Commanding-in-Chief Eastern Naval Command (FOC-in-C East) is the Flag Officer Commanding Eastern Fleet (FOCEF), Commodore Commanding Submarines (East) (COMCOS (E)), Admiral Superintendent Dockyard for Visakhapatnam, shore establishments, and five Naval Officers-in-Charge (NOICs).

The Eastern naval Command has the states of Andhra Pradesh, Odisha and Tamil Nadu etc., under its area of responsibility.

The FOC-in-C (East) is the submarine operating authority, under whom COMCOS (E) operates. The 11th (Sindhughosh class submarine) and 8th (Foxtrot class) Submarine Squadrons operate under COMCOS (E). INS Virbahu, a submarine base commissioned on 19 May 1971, is the alma mater of the Indian Navy submariners.

Organization 
The Eastern Naval Command is organized as follows:

Naval bases

The headquarters in Visakhapatnam, is also a strategically important dockyard for two nuclear-powered submarines. Due to congestion and heavy shipping traffic, a new 20 square km base INS Varsha is being developed for exclusive naval use about 50 km south of Visakhapatnam.

The Eastern Navy fleet is distributed among its bases at Paradip, Tuticorin, Kakinada and Chennai on the east coast, and in the Andaman and Nicobar Islands. The Navy has opened its latest naval air base, INS Baaz, at the southernmost tip of the Andaman and Nicobar Islands to secure the strategically important Straits of Malacca, and another naval air station in Kolkata to base an unmanned aerial vehicle squadron.

Capabilities
In 2005, Eastern Naval Command was home to 30 warships. INS Jalashwa is the flagship of Eastern Fleet and provides amphibious capabilities to the Indian Navy in the Bay of Bengal. Eastern Fleet is equipped with submarine pens and maintenance dockyards. The Amphibious Task Group of Eastern Naval Fleet has INS Jalashwa (LPD). It also includes five Rajput-class destroyers, four Kora-class corvettes, three Godavari-class frigates, three Shivalik-class frigates, Sindhughosh-class submarines and the   INS Chakra. Naval aviation is provided by Westland Sea King helicopters. Apart from these, a number of smaller vessels such as fast attack craft made the total fleet strength of the command 52 vessels in 2012.

Future
Until 1997,  was the flagship of Eastern Fleet. After her de-commissioning in 1997, the Eastern Fleet has been without an aircraft carrier. Its aircraft carrier capability will get restored after first indigenously built aircraft carrier  joins the Eastern Fleet by 2023 after completing extensive sea trials and is likely to based in Vishakapatnam.

List of commanders

See also
 Southern Naval Command
 Western Naval Command

References

External link

Indian Navy
Naval units and formations of India
Commands of the Indian Navy